Ira Thomas Greene (born April 6, 1967) is an American former professional baseball pitcher who played in Major League Baseball (MLB) for the Atlanta Braves and Philadelphia Phillies from 1989 to 1995. He also played for the Houston Astros in 1997. He previously served a post-game studio analyst for the Philadelphia Phillies.

High school
Greene played baseball at Whiteville High School in North Carolina where he was teammates with Patrick Lennon and won a state championship. As a sophomore he had a 10–0 record and hit .350. As a senior he hit .490, recorded a 0.07 earned run average and struck out 270 batters in 124 innings. He threw nine total no-hitters in high school.

Pro career
On May 23, 1991, Greene threw a no-hitter for the Phillies against the Montreal Expos. He struck out 10 batters and walked 7. Greene was starting for only the second time in the season and 15th time in his major league career. Greene was pitching in place of Danny Cox who had suffered a pulled groin in his last start. Greene became the first visiting pitcher to hurl a no-hitter in Montreal's history as the Phillies defeated the Expos, 2–0 before an Olympic Stadium crowd of 8,833.

The next year in 1992, tendonitis in his arm and shoulder caused him to miss  months of the season; he appeared in only 13 games.

His best year as a pitcher was in 1993 as a member of the Phillies. He had a record of 16–4, tied with Curt Schilling for the most wins with that club. During that same season, he started Game 4 of the 1993 World Series for the Phillies against the Toronto Blue Jays.

Greene remained in baseball for a few more years, splitting season between the Majors and the minors as he tried to get his ailing shoulder into shape. Unfortunately for Greene his shoulder never completely healed. Greene started only 19 games in the big leagues from the 1994 season until he left the game in 1997.

Greene was a GM of the Southern Collegiate baseball team, the Monroe Channel Cats, and also maintains a real estate business.

See also
 List of Major League Baseball no-hitters

Notes

External links

Living people
1967 births
Philadelphia Phillies players
Atlanta Braves players
Houston Astros players
Richmond Braves players
Greenville Braves players
Reading Phillies players
Sumter Braves players
Clearwater Phillies players
New Orleans Zephyrs players
Scranton/Wilkes-Barre Red Barons players
Pulaski Braves players
Major League Baseball pitchers
Baseball players from North Carolina
People from Lumberton, North Carolina